Sammy Lightfoot is a video game written by Warren Schwader for the Apple II and published by Sierra On-Line in 1983.  It is a multi-screen platform game (or "climbing game", as the genre was called in the US in 1983), in the vein of Donkey Kong. Sammy Lightfoot follows the travails of a circus worker who jumps and climbs through a number of perilous situations. It was initially ported to the Commodore 64 followed by ColecoVision and the PC-8800 series.

Reception
The Commodore 64 Home Companion stated that Sammy Lightfoot captures the cartoon spirit and graphic style of Donkey Kong without being a simple donkey clone".

See also
Apple Cider Spider, another Apple II platform game released by Sierra On-Line in 1983.

References

1983 video games
Apple II games
ColecoVision games
Commodore 64 games
Platform games
Sierra Entertainment games
Video games developed in the United States